The teams competing in Group 1 of the 2004 UEFA European Under-21 Championships qualifying competition were France, Slovenia, Israel, Cyprus and Malta.

Standings

Matches
All times are CET.

Goalscorers
5 goals
 Giorgos Nicolaou

4 goals

 Habib Bamogo
 Florent Sinama Pongolle

2 goals

 Chrysafis Chrysafi
 Omer Golan

1 goal

 Alekos Alekou
 Nektarios Alexandrou
 Antonis Antoniou
 Loizos Kakoyiannis
 Charalampos Pittakas
 Alou Diarra
 Anthony Le Tallec
 Lionel Mathis
 Matt Moussilou
 Jérémy Toulalan
 Tamir Cohen
 Guillermo Israilevich
 Reuven Oved
 Yosef Shivhon
 Boštjan Cesar
 Klemen Lavrič
 Aleš Mejač
 Denis Žilavec

1 own goal
 Rahamim Halis (playing against France)

External links
 Group 1 at UEFA.com

Group 1
UEFA
UEFA
Under
Under